Niban Rock is a rock which protrudes into the sea 8 nautical miles (15 km) southwest of Cape Hinode, on the coast of Queen Maud Land. Mapped from surveys and air photos by Japanese Antarctic Research Expedition (JARE), 1957–62, and named Niban-iwa (number two rock).

Rock formations of Queen Maud Land
Prince Olav Coast